Frank Bardacke is an American political activist, labor activist, and author. He protested the Vietnam War.

Bardacke was featured in the film Berkeley in the Sixties and according to the film he: "Left Berkeley in 1970, and spent the next decade working in the fields and canneries near Salinas, California. He is still a leftist, active in labor and community politics." He had founded a Teamsters for a Democratic Union branch in Watsonville.

In 2011, he published Trampling Out the Vintage: Cesar Chavez and the two souls of the United Farm Workers.

References

External links 
 Frank Bardacke papers, Stanford University

Year of birth missing (living people)
Living people
Trade unionists from California
American anti–Vietnam War activists